Sandy's Compound is a 30-year-old sports complex located in, Bhagalpur City, Bihar, opposite of police line Bhagalpur. It contains a Doordarshan TV Centre, volleyball court and a small open stadium. It also provides state level matches and is one of the best fields in Bhagalpur.

This is Sandy's Compound, originally named after a Briton who was the Mayor of Bhagalpur. A piece of land measuring, more or less, 307 bighas 15 kathas and 14 chitaks  of standard measurement, bounded on the -- (North-By Cleveland Road, South-By Central Jail Road, East-By Central Jail Road, West-By Beatson Road) -- is required within the aforesaid villages of Adampur, Kathalbari and Khanjarpur. Mentioned on page no. 139 of the Calcutta Gazette of July 18, 1906, the land was acquired by the government for public purposes. Nowadays there are many things that had build in this Sandis compound, like swimming pool, Cafeteria, Nehru memorial, Tennis court, Badminton court, Football ground, Butterfly Zone, Open air theatre (OAT), Kids play zone, and there is many monuments are existing.

Sandy's Compound Enclosure

Sandy's Compound Enclosure is a cricket ground in Bhagalpur, Bihar. The ground is one of the few stadium that has cricket matches for Bihar cricket team and in Bihar. The stadium has hosted its only cricket match when Bihar cricket team played against Assam cricket team in 1981 in 1981/82 Ranji Trophy as match was won by Bihar cricket team by innings and 2 runs.

References

External links 

 Cricketarchive
 Cricinfo

bhagalpur Sandy's Compound
Heart of Bhagalpur people

Bhagalpur
Sports venues in Bihar
Year of establishment missing